Gelmets (Tsakhur: Гелмец) is a rural locality (a selo) and the administrative centre of Gelmetsinskoye Rural Settlement, Rutulsky District, Republic of Dagestan, Russia. The population was  609 as of 2010. There are 3 streets.

Geography 
Gelmets is located at the foot of the Gelmets-Akhtynsky ridge. It is located 31 km northwest of Rutul (the district's administrative centre) by road. Mikik and Tsakhur are the nearest rural localities.

Nationalities 
Tsakhur people live there.

References 

Rural localities in Rutulsky District